The Honda Stream is a car manufactured by the Japanese automaker Honda since October 2000. The second generation model was officially presented on 13 July 2006. It has been described as a multi-purpose vehicle (MPV) or as an estate car.



First generation (RN1–5; 2000) 

The first generation Honda Stream (Body codes: RN1/2/3/4/5) went on sale in Japan on 27 October 2000, and in Europe in 2001. It was largely based on the Civic, with the same flat chassis but added 100 mm in length to accommodate the third row of seats. In advertising and promotional brochures Honda describes it as a sporty 7-seater.

The first generation Honda Stream was available with a 1.7L D17 engine and a 2.0L K20A, equipped with a 4-speed automatic transmission and a 5-speed automatic transmission with sequential mode respectively. For some export markets, a manual version was also offered.

The first generation Honda Stream received a facelift in September 2003. In December 2003, Honda Stream Absolute debuted with DI 2.0 L K20B engines with improved fuel efficiency equipped with CVT. The K20B was Honda's first lean-burn petrol engine using direct injection technology, it was only offered in Japan. No other Honda vehicles were equipped with direct injection technology until the Earth Dreams engines were launched in 2012 in the United States.

From 2004 onwards it was sold with six seats rather than seven.

Second generation (RN6–9; 2006) 

The second generation Honda Stream (body codes: RN6/7/8/9) is offered internationally in two specification levels. The lower-end spec features the R18A 1.8-liter SOHC i-VTEC (2-stage) engine with a 5-speed automatic gearbox (and a 5-speed manual transmission in some countries). The higher-end spec features the R20A 2.0-liter SOHC i-VTEC engine with variable length intake manifold, a CVT transmission and optional 7-speed paddle shift function for FWD models; or a 5-speed automatic transmission that comes with AWD models. The RSZ model also comes with firmer damping shock absorbers with anti-roll/sway bar for the rear setup. 

From April 2012, only the RSZ model is available.

Honda stopped production of the Honda Stream in 2014 for the Japanese and Singaporean markets. It was still on sale in Malaysia until it was discontinued in that country in 2015. In Japan and Singapore however, it was replaced by the Honda Jade.

Malaysia
The Honda Stream was launched in November 2007, powered by a 1.8 L engine producing  at 6,300 rpm and 174 Nm of torque at 4,300 rpm and is mated to a 5-speed automatic gearbox, with fourth and fifth being overdrive gears for better highway fuel economy. In February 2009, Honda launched the RSZ variant joining the normal Stream.

Singapore
In Singapore, the Honda Stream is available through the authorised distributor and parallel import. The parallel import Stream was launched slightly earlier than from the authorised distributor. It was available in the standard 1.8 model and also the higher spec RSZ model. Only 1 RST model was ever registered back in 2010.

Stream RST (2009-2012) & TS (2010-2012)
In some countries, this variant of the Stream has only 2 rows of seats (6 seats). For the RST model, a combination of the removal of the third row seat (in some countries) and adoption of light weight 17" alloy wheels reduces weight and improves handling and acceleration; the handling is further enhanced by suspension tuning and a tailgate spoiler is also added.

Stream ZS (2009-2012)
A ZS model available only in FWD was added in September 2009.

Body Style

Engines

Transmissions

References

External links 

 Official News from Honda World website
 iFixit: 2000-2006 Honda Stream

Stream
Minivans
Compact MPVs
Front-wheel-drive vehicles
All-wheel-drive vehicles
Vehicles with CVT transmission
Euro NCAP small MPVs
Cars introduced in 2000
Cars of Japan
2000s cars
2010s cars